Agazio Loiero (born 14 January 1940) is an Italian politician, former President of Calabria and minister in the D'Alema II Cabinet and the Amato II Cabinet.

Biography 
Graduated in Letters and Philosophy, Loiero has worked as a columnist for newspapers such as Il Messaggero, L'Unità and the Gazzetta del Sud.

Political career 
Loiero joined the Christian Democracy with which he was elected city councilor in Catanzaro. From 1987 to 1994, Loiero was elected to the Chamber of Deputies with the DC; he tried to be re-elected in 1994 with the Pact for Italy but failed the election.

In 1996, Loiero joined Pier Ferdinando Casini's Christian Democratic Centre and is re-elected to the Senate. Two years later, Loiero left the Pole for Freedoms coalition and joined the Union of Democrats for Europe, being later appointed Minister for Parliamentary Relations in the D'Alema II Cabinet and Minister for Regional Affairs in the Amato II Cabinet.

In 2001, Loiero returns to the Chamber of Deputies, leaving his seat in Parliament when in the 2005 regional election Loiero is elected President of Calabria. Loiero fails to be re-elected governor in the 2010 regional election.

In 2007, Loiero joins the National Leadership of the Democratic Party, giving his support to Rosy Bindi during the 2007 primaries. Loiero left the party in 2011, after having been very critical to secretary Pier Luigi Bersani, and joined the Movement for the Autonomies, though he finally left the movement in 2013 when it made an electoral agreement with the centre-right coalition.

Judicial proceedings 
Together with his predecessor Giuseppe Chiaravalloti, Loiero has been involved in the Why Not investigation, then led by judge Luigi de Magistris, created to shed light on alleged wrongdoing in the management of public funds for the development of Calabria. Loiero was charged for the crime of abuse of office but in 2013 he was absolved definitively by the Court of Cassation for not having committed the fact.

References

External links 
Files about his parliamentary activities (in Italian): X, XI, XIII, XIV legislature

1940 births
Living people
Christian Democracy (Italy) politicians
Italian People's Party (1994) politicians
Christian Democratic Centre politicians
Democracy is Freedom – The Daisy politicians
Democratic Party (Italy) politicians
20th-century Italian politicians
21st-century Italian politicians
Government ministers of Italy
People from the Province of Crotone